Hailey Dawn Birnie (born July 11, 1982) is a Canadian curler and actress from Whitehorse, Yukon. She currently skips her own team out of the Whitehorse Curling Club.

Curling career
While in juniors, Birnie made four appearances at the Canadian Junior Curling Championships in 1998, 1999, 2000 and 2001, all as second for Nicole Baldwin. In their first two appearances, the team posted their best records, finishing 6–6 in both 1998 and 1999. Their worst performance came in 2000 where they went 3–9, finishing in twelfth place. Their final showing in 2001 saw them finish in ninth with a 5–7 record.

Birnie's next curling success wouldn't come until 2019 when she won the Yukon Scotties Tournament of Hearts. Her team, with skip Nicole Baldwin, second Ladene Shaw and lead Helen Strong represented the Yukon at the 2019 Scotties Tournament of Hearts in Sydney, Nova Scotia. There, they finished with a 1–6 record, beating the Northwest Territories' Kerry Galusha rink 13–6 in Draw 14.

The following season, Birnie returned to the Scotties, skipping her own team of Chelsea Duncan, Gabrielle Plonka, Kimberly Tuor and Rhonda Horte. Through their seven games, the team finished with a winless 0–7 record. After not competing in 2021, Birnie won the Yukon Scotties championship in 2022, defeating the defending champions Team Laura Eby 2–0 in the best-of-three qualifier series. The team finished 0–8 at the 2022 Scotties Tournament of Hearts in Thunder Bay, Ontario.

Acting
Birnie is also an actress, and has appeared on such television shows as Supernatural and Smallville.

Personal life
Birnie is employed as a mental health counsellor and a film producer.

Teams

References

External links

1982 births
Canadian women curlers
Living people
Curlers from Yukon
20th-century Canadian women
21st-century Canadian women
Sportspeople from Whitehorse
Canadian women film producers
Actresses from Yukon